The 1996 United States presidential election in the District of Columbia took place on November 5, 1996, as part of the 1996 United States presidential election. Voters chose three representatives, or electors to the Electoral College, who voted for president and vice president.

Washington, D.C. was won by President Bill Clinton (D) over Senator Bob Dole (R-KS), with Clinton winning 85.19% to 9.34% by a margin of 75.85%. Political activist Ralph Nader (Green Party) finished in third, with 2.57% of the popular vote, and businessman Ross Perot (Reform Party) finished in fourth, with 1.94%.

Washington, D.C. was again Ross Perot's worst performance in the country. This is also the only time Perot finished fourth in any location in either 1992 or 1996.

Results

See also
 United States presidential elections in the District of Columbia

References

1996
DC
United States Pres